The 1994–95 National Hurling League, known for sponsorship reasons as the Church & General National Hurling League, was the 64th edition of the National Hurling League, which ran from 8 October 1994 until 7 May 1995.

Kilkenny won the league, beating Clare by 2-12 to 0-9 in the final.

Structure
There are eight teams in each division. Each plays each other team once, home or away, and receives two points for a win and one for a draw.

The top two teams in Division 1 advance to the semi-finals. The third- and fourth-placed teams in Division 1 go into the quarter-finals, as do the top two teams in Division 2.

The top two teams in Divisions 2, 3 and 4 are promoted for the following season. The bottom two in Divisions 1, 2 and 3 are relegated.

Division 1

Tipperary came into the season as defending champions of the 1993-94 season. Clare and Kilkenny joined Division 1 as the promoted teams.

On 7 May 1995, Kilkenny won the title after a 2-12 to 0-9 win over Clare in the final. It was their 9th league title overall and their first since 1989-90.

Antrim, Laois and Limerick were relegated from Division 1.

Tipperary's Michael Cleary was the Division 1 top scorer with 3-34.

Table

Group stage

Knock-out stage

Quarter-finals

Semi-finals

Final

Scoring statistics

Top scorers overall

Top scorers in a single game

Division 2

On 26 March 1995, Waterford secured the title after an 0-11 to 0-6 win over Kerry in the final round of the group stage. Kerry and Offaly were also promoted to Division 1.

Carlow and Meath were relegated from Division 2.

Table

Knock-out stage

Play-off

External links
 Results page

References

National Hurling League seasons
League
League